Salmiah may refer to:
 Al-Salmiya SC, Kuwaiti soccer team
 Salmiah, Iran, a village in Khuzestan Province, Iran